John Godfind Hillebrand was a Puisne Justice of the Supreme Court of Ceylon. He was the first Burgher to sit on the bench of the Supreme Court of Ceylon as well as the first Burgher member of the Legislative Council of Ceylon from 1825 to 1843. He was appointed, after the death of John Fredrick Stoddart, as Acting Second Puisne Justice on 23 November 1839. Hillebrand retained his Legislative Council seat while on the bench. He was the first Proctor to sit on the Sri Lankan Supreme Court. He was replaced on the bench by William Ogle Carr

References

Citations

Bibliography

 

19th-century Sri Lankan people
Burgher judges
Puisne Justices of the Supreme Court of Ceylon
Members of the Legislative Council of Ceylon